Michelle de Bruyn (born 15 August 1965) is a former association football player who represented New Zealand at international level.

De Bruyn made her Football Ferns début in a 0–0 draw with Chinese Taipei on 9 December 1984, and finished her international career with four caps to her credit.

References

1965 births
Living people
New Zealand women's international footballers
New Zealand women's association footballers
New Zealand people of Dutch descent
Sportspeople from New Plymouth
Women's association footballers not categorized by position